K with stroke (Ꝁ, ꝁ) is a letter of the Latin alphabet, derived from K with the addition of a bar through the letter.

It was used in Latin as an abbreviation for words that start with k. In Old Norse it was used for "konungr" (king) or to abbreviate the word "skulu" (shall) to "sꝁ".

Computer encodings
Capital and small K with stroke is encoded in Unicode as of version 5.1, at codepoints U+A740 and U+A741.

See also
Ҟ ҟ: Ka with stroke

References

Phonetic transcription symbols
Latin letters with diacritics